TV-pucken is a Swedish national ice hockey tournament for district teams of boys under 15 years of age. Since 2019, girls also compete in TV-pucken with their own tournament. It was created on the initiative of Swedish ice hockey player Sven "Tumba" Johansson.

The tournament is named "TV-pucken" because when it was first played in 1959, every game was broadcast on television, but nowadays only the playoff games are shown. It is generally considered a great merit for a Swedish ice hockey player to have played in TV-pucken.

The allowed maximum age of the players was originally 16 years, but reduced to 15 in 1979. During a meeting on Bosön in December 2002 it was decided to increase the age from 15 to 16 from the 2003 tournament, to prevent the "early exclusion" caused by young players giving up ice hockey.

The tournament has also given birth to the expressions of TV-pucken crowd and TV-pucken joy as the entire team throws themself onto the playing surface celebrating goals and victories.

Starting in the year 2000 Stockholm became allowed to participate with two teams., following an idea of the Stockholm Ice Hockey Association on its own after claiming to have so many skilled young players. and this concept has also been used later. In 2012 Småland also participated with two teams ("red" and "yellow") and so also in 2013. For the 2016 tournament the Swedish Ice Hockey Association decided to set up a new team, consisting of 22 players who'd been rejected from respective district association teams.

The 1997 edition aired over TV 3 as "TV-cupen".

A girls' tournament was added in 2019, replacing Stålbucklan.

Several "spinoff"-variations were later developed, like cross-country skiing's TV-skidan starting in 1965, but never gaining the same popularity as TV-pucken. Even other team sports have similar tournaments, often not airing over TV, where Swedish youth district teams challenge each other.

Districts participating 
There are 24 district teams divided in four groups participating in TV-pucken. Stockholm, the capital of Sweden, traditionally participates with two teams, which are named Vit (white) and Röd (red). In 2009, however, only one Stockholm team participated in the tournament.

TV-pucken winners

Boys 
Winners since 1986.

Girls 
Winners since 2019.

Statistics

Popular culture 
In Berts bravader, Bert states that a romance between him and his 56 years old counselor wouldn't work because talking old memories from the past would for Iris mean second world war, and Bert would talk about the TV-pucken final game of the previous year.

References

External links 
 
  at SVT Play 
 

Ice hockey competitions in Sweden
Recurring sporting events established in 1959
1959 establishments in Sweden